Château d'O (English: Castle of O), also known as Domaine d'O, is one of the chateaux, old country mansions or follies, built by wealthy merchants, from the 18th century onwards, surrounding the French city of Montpellier.

The South entrance leads to the 18th century mansion, while North entrance leads to modern buildings, with Théâtre Jean-Claude Carrière.

It is now a main sight of the city of Montpellier. Part of the venue are :
 the château d'O itself, with its French formal gardens
 the Théâtre d'O, open-sky in the green theatre 
 the Bassin d'O, the pond

See also 
 Water tower (in French château d'eau, an expression which sounds the same as Château d'O)
 Montpellier follies
 Aqueduc Saint-Clément, near Domaine du Château d'O

References 

 Deux châteaux des campagnes montpelliéraines: château de la Mosson, château d'O. J Coubès, M Guyot, 1988, Archives départementales de l'Hérault
 Les jardins du Château d'O, à Montpellier, au XVIIIe siècle: création et évolution entre 1722 et 1766. AA Cros and F Michaud, etudesheraultaises.fr
 Charles Gabriel Le Blanc, seigneur de Puech-Villa créateur du Château d'O. P Couder, 1993, Université du Tiers Temps

External links 
 
 Website

Buildings and structures in Montpellier
Châteaux in Hérault
Gardens in Hérault
Tourist attractions in Montpellier